The 2012–13 USC Trojans men's basketball team represented the University of Southern California during the 2012–13 NCAA Division I men's basketball season. They were led by fourth year head coach Kevin O'Neill until January 14 when O'Neill was fired. Bob Cantu was named as an interim head coach for the remainder. They played their home games at the Galen Center and were members of the Pac-12 Conference. They finished the season 14–18, 9–9 in Pac-12 play to finish in a four-way tie for sixth place. They lost in the first round of the Pac-12 tournament to Utah.

Roster

2012–13 Schedule and results
 
|-
!colspan=9| Regular season

|-
!colspan=9| Pac-12 tournament

Notes
 January 14, 2013 – Head coach Kevin O'Neill was removed as head coach and associate head coach Bob Cantu took over as interim head coach, athletic director Pat Haden announced.

References

USC
USC Trojans men's basketball seasons
USC Trojans
USC Trojans